The "fruit machine" was a device developed in Canada by Frank Robert Wake, a psychology professor with Carleton University in the 1950s that was supposed to be able to identify gay men (derogatorily referred to as "fruits"). The subjects were made to view pornography; the device then measured the diameter of the pupils of the eyes (pupillary response test), perspiration, and pulse for a supposed erotic response.

The machine was employed in Canada in the 1950s and 1960s during a campaign to eliminate all gay men from the civil service, the Royal Canadian Mounted Police (RCMP), and the military. A substantial number of workers did lose their jobs. Although funding for the project was cut off in the late 1960s, the investigations continued, and the RCMP collected files on 9,000 people who had been investigated.

The machine used a chair similar to that used by dentists.  It had a pulley with a camera going towards the pupils, with a black box located in front of it that displayed pictures. The pictures ranged from the mundane to sexually explicit photos of men and women. It had previously been determined that the pupils would dilate in relation to the amount of interest in the picture, in a technique termed "the pupillary response test".

People were first led to believe that the machine's purpose was to rate stress. After knowledge of its real purpose became widespread, few people volunteered for it.

Faulty test parameters
The accuracy and functional mechanism of the "fruit machine" was questionable. First, the pupillary response test was based on fatally flawed assumptions: that visual stimuli would give an involuntary reaction that can be measured scientifically; that homosexuals and heterosexuals would respond to these stimuli differently; and that there were only two types of sexuality. A physiological problem with the method was that the researchers failed to take into account the varying sizes of the pupils and the differing distances between the eyes. Other problems that existed were that the pictures of the subjects' eyes had to be taken from an angle, as the camera would have blocked the subjects' view of the photographs if it were placed directly in front.  Also, the amount of light coming from the photographs changed with each slide, causing the subjects' pupils to dilate in a way that was unrelated to their interest in the picture. Finally, the dilation of the pupils was also exceedingly difficult to measure, as the change was often smaller than one millimeter.

The idea was based on a study done by an American university professor, which measured the sizes of the subjects' pupils as they walked through the aisles of grocery stores.

In popular culture
Brian Drader's 1998 play The Fruit Machine juxtaposes the fruit machine project with a parallel storyline about contemporary homophobia.

Sarah Fodey's 2018 documentary film The Fruit Machine profiled the effects of the project on several of the people affected by it.

See also 
 Lie detector polygraph, a device to detect the physiological responses indicative of lying
 Lavender scare
 GCC homosexuality test
 Gaydar
 Penile plethysmograph
 Vaginal photoplethysmography
 Voight-Kampff machine, a fictional device that detects non-human emotional responses

Notes

Sources
 Gary Kinsman et al.,Whose National Security?: Canadian State Surveillance and the Creation of Enemies, (Between the Lines, Canada, 2000) ,chapter 10.
 John Sawatsky. Men in the Shadows: The RCMP Security Service. (Doubleday Canada, 1980) , chapters 10 and 11.
 CBC Radio 1 The Current, 9 May 2005
 Gary Kinsman, "'Character Weakness' and 'Fruit Machines': Towards an Analysis of the Anti-Homosexual Security Campaign in the Canadian Civil Service," Labour/Le Travail, 35 (Spring 1995).

External links
 What About Freud? Canada's New Cold War History
 The National Security Campaigns
 Fruit Machine – radio interview. CBC Radio 1 The Current, 9 May 2005 (begins at 2:25 into clip)

Homophobia
LGBT rights in Canada
LGBT history in Canada
Law enforcement in Canada
Legal history of Canada
LGBT terminology
1950s in LGBT history
1960s in LGBT history
Gay history
Persecution of LGBT people
Pseudoscience